Rekrut 67, Petersen is a 1952 Danish family film directed by Poul Bang.

Cast
Lily Broberg as Grete Petersen
Gunnar Lauring as Kaptajn Fang
Kate Mundt as Anna Mogensen
Ib Schønberg as Dr. Christiansen
Buster Larsen as Peter Rasmussen
Dirch Passer as Lillebilchauffør Larsen
Rasmus Christiansen as Viceværten
Henry Nielsen as Mælkemanden
Henny Lindorff Buckhøj as Fru Rasmussen
Ove Sprogøe as Rekrut 68
Valdemar Skjerning as Direktør I stormagasinet
Svend Pedersen as Programleder
Vibeke Warlev as Pianistinden
Marie Bisgaard as Koncertsangerinde
Inge Ketti as Alma, stuepige på Krogerup
Robert Eiming as Direktionssekretær
Inge-Lise Grue as Ekspeditrice
Else Jarlbak as Kunde I stormagasin
Agnes Phister-Andresen as Kunde I stormagasin
Edith Hermansen

External links

1952 films
1950s Danish-language films
Danish black-and-white films
Films directed by Poul Bang
Films scored by Sven Gyldmark